The National Society of Public Accountants (NSPA), later shortened to National Society of Accountants (NSA), is a professional association for tax and accounting professionals; NSA and its state affiliates represent more than 30,000 independent practitioners who provide accounting, tax, auditing, financial and estate planning, and management services to 19 million individuals and businesses. NSA's mission is to provide national leadership in the profession of accountancy and taxation through the advocacy of practice rights, and by the establishment and promotion of high standards in ethics, education, and professional excellence.

History 
NSA was incorporated as nonprofit corporation National Society of Public Accountants (NSPA) in 1945 to promote professionalism and in order that its members had the right to represent their clients before the US Treasury Department.  Its first headquarters was in Oklahoma City followed by a move to St. Louis in 1947 and then, in 1955, to Washington, D.C.  The name was changed to the National Society of Accountants in 1995, although the organization still retains the National Society of Public Accountants as its official name.

Education and events
NSA offers continuing professional education (CPE) online and on-demand webinars and training seminars for tax and accounting professionals and offers self-study exam preparation courses. NSA holds an annual conference with live CPE programs and offers an Enrolled Agent Review Course, an Accredited Tax Preparer Review Course, and an Individual Form 1040 Tax Seminar.

NSA is approved as an official provider of continuing professional education (CPE) by the National Association of State Boards of Accountancy (NASBA), the Internal Revenue Service (IRS), the Accreditation Council for Accountancy and Taxation (ACAT), and the California Tax Education Council (CTEC).

Scholarships
Formed in 1969, the NSA Scholarship Foundation is a 501(c)3, tax-exempt organization and relies on voluntary, tax-deductible contributions to support its programs. A Board of Trustees holds full fiduciary responsibility for management of the Foundation and its programs. Each year, thousands of students contact NSA seeking help to meet the ever-increasing costs of higher education. In response, the NSA Scholarship Foundation provides financial encouragement to promising accounting students across the country. The Foundation awards scholarships to undergraduates enrolled in a degree program at an accredited two- or four-year college or university. Applicants for awards are judged on the basis of scholastic achievement, demonstrated leadership ability, and financial need. In 2015, the Foundation awarded $45,875 to 39 deserving students.

Accreditation council
In 1973, NSA established ACAT (Accreditation Council for Accountancy and Taxation) as an independent credentialing body to provide a standard of competency in the area of public accounting. The Council seeks to identify professionals in independent practice who specialize in providing financial, accounting and taxation services to individuals and small to mid-size businesses. Professionals receive accreditation through examination and maintain their accreditation through commitment to a significant program of continuing professional education and adherence to the Council's Code of Ethics and Rules of Professional Conduct.

ACAT offers four credentials to candidates:
 Accredited Business Accountant/Advisor (ABA)
 Accredited Tax Preparer (ATP)
 Accredited Retirement Advisor (ARA)
 Accredited Tax Advisor (ATA)

The ABA and ATP credentials are exempt from the Annual Federal Tax Refresher Course and testing requirements,
automatically qualify for the Annual Filing Season Program Record of Completion (with a valid PTIN, Continuing professional education and Circular 230) and are included in the IRS public Registered Tax Return Preparer Directory.

References

External links 
 NSA Website
 NSA Scholarship program
 NSA Leadership and Organization
 Accreditation Council for Accountancy and Taxation

Professional associations based in the United States
Organizations established in 1945